The U.S. International Figure Skating Classic is a senior international figure skating competition. In some years it is part of the ISU Challenger Series. Medals are awarded in men's singles, ladies' singles, pair skating, and ice dancing.

History
In 2012, the International Skating Union designated the U.S. International as one of the events at which skaters could achieve a minimum score.

Organized by U.S. Figure Skating, the event was held for the first time in September 2012 in Salt Lake City. Max Aaron won the men's title, Agnes Zawadzki the ladies' title, Kirsten Moore-Towers / Dylan Moscovitch the pairs event, and Piper Gilles / Paul Poirier the ice dancing event.

The event became part of the ISU Challenger Series in the 2014–15 season.

Medalists
CS: ISU Challenger Series

Men

Women

Pairs

Ice dancing

References

External links
 

 
International figure skating competitions hosted by the United States
ISU Challenger Series